Didier Borotra (born 30 August 1937) is a former member of the Senate of France, representing the Pyrénées-Atlantiques department from 1992 to 2011. He was re-elected in 2001 and did not stand in 2011.

He served alongside Auguste Cazalet (1983-2011), Louis Althapé (1992-2001), André Labbarère (2001-2006) and Annie Jarraud-Vergnolle (2006-2011).

He is a member of the Centrist Union group and the MoDem. At the end of his tenure, he served on the Senate Committee for Foreign Affairs, Defence and the Armed Forces.

References
Page on the Senate website

1937 births
Living people
Politicians from Nantes
French Senators of the Fifth Republic
Senators of Pyrénées-Atlantiques
Mayors of places in Nouvelle-Aquitaine
French twins